The Hampton Gulls were a minor league professional ice hockey team based in Hampton, Virginia, from 1974 to 1978 at the Hampton Coliseum. The Gulls played three seasons in the Southern Hockey League, beginning in 1974. When that league folded in 1977, the Hampton played one season in the American Hockey League. The Gulls were a World Hockey Association farm team to the Cincinnati Stingers each season. John Brophy was team's only head coach during its existence. Hampton ceased operations on February 10, 1978, part way through its fourth season.

History
The franchise originated as an expansion team for the 1974–75 Southern Hockey League season in Fayetteville, North Carolina. The new team was named after the Fayetteville Arsenal, and was scheduled to play at the Cumberland County Memorial Arena. In October 1974, owner Bill Raue moved the team before playing any games, when availability of home ice dates became a problem, and the Hampton Coliseum was available. Claude Chartre led the team in scoring with 112 points, and Lorne Rombough led with 56 goals. Hampton finished the season in second place, and finished runners-up to the Charlotte Checkers in the playoff finals.

Before the 1975–76 Southern Hockey League season, the team was purchased by Charles Wornom, a city councillor and future mayor of Hampton, Virginia, for $40,000. The season saw the Gulls sharing the greater Hampton Roads area with the Tidewater Sharks, another SHL team in Norfolk, Virginia. Art Stratton led the team in scoring with 78 points, and Larry Billows led with 29 goals. Hampton repeated the second place finish in the regular season, and being runners-up to the Charlotte Checkers in the playoff finals.

In the 1976–77 Southern Hockey League season, Hampton was affiliated with both the Cincinnati Stingers, and the Minnesota Fighting Saints. The Gulls were in first place when the Southern Hockey League collapsed in January 1977. Claude Chartre led the team in scoring with 58 points, and Pat Donnelly led with 23 goals.

The Gulls joined the American Hockey League for the 1977–78 AHL season, and affiliated with the Edmonton Oilers in addition to Cincinnati. Paul O'Neil led the team in scoring with 44 points, and Danny Arndt led with 20 goals. Hampton played 46 games into the schedule, and were last in place when the franchise folded due to financial issues.

Results
Season-by-season results:

Notable players
Rod Langway played with the Hampton Gulls in the 1977–78 AHL season, and was later inducted into the Hockey Hall of Fame.

Notable Gulls players that also played in the National Hockey League or World Hockey Association:

Bruce Abbey
Jeff Allan
Steve Alley
Steve Andrascik
Danny Arndt
Frank Beaton
Larry Bolonchuk
Michel Boudreau
Curt Brackenbury
Jeff Carlson
Claude Chartre
Brian Coates
Alain Cote
Richard Coutu
Pat Donnelly
Denis Dupere
Mike Dwyer
Andre Gill
Bill Gilligan
Dave Gorman
David Hanson
Derek Harker
Jamie Hislop
Paul Hoganson
Bob Johnson
Kevin Kemp
John Kiely
Mike Korney
Pierre Lagace
Floyd Lahache
Gord Lane
Rod Langway
Norm LaPointe
Roger Lemelin
Jacques Locas
Ted Long
Jim McElmury
Bill McKenzie
Eddie Mio
Ron Morgan
Wayne Mosdell
Murray Myers
Cam Newton
Don O'Donoghue
Bill Oleschuk
Wally Olds
Paul O'Neil
Francois Ouimet
Glenn Patrick
Randy Pierce
Michel Plasse
Kelly Pratt
Bill Prentice
Lorne Rombough
Ted Scharf
Buzz Schneider
Ron Serafini
Larry Skinner
Dale Smedsmo
Gene Sobchuk
Bill Steele
Bob Stephenson
Art Stratton
Paul Terbenche
Hal Willis

References

1974 establishments in Virginia
1978 disestablishments in Virginia
Cincinnati Stingers minor league affiliates
Defunct American Hockey League teams
Edmonton Oilers minor league affiliates
Ice hockey teams in Virginia
Minnesota Fighting Saints minor league affiliates
Southern Hockey League (1973–1977) teams
Ice hockey clubs established in 1974
Sports clubs disestablished in 1978